The Fajã do Cerrado das Silvas, is a permanent debris field, built from the collapsing cliffs on the northern coast of the civil parish of Velas, in the municipality of Velas, island of São Jorge, in the Portuguese archipelago of the Azores.

Located between Fajã Pelada and Fajã da Choupana it is accessible from a small trail, where transport is difficult.

References

See also
 List of fajãs in the Azores

São Jorge Island
Faja Cerrado Silvas
Cerrado Silvas